

Wilhelm Lorenz (25 April 1894 – 2 January 1943) was a general in the Wehrmacht of Nazi Germany during World War II. He was a recipient of the Knight's Cross of the Iron Cross. Lorenz was wounded on 27 December 1942, and died from his wounds on 2 January 1943 in Demyansk, occupied Soviet Union. He was posthumously promoted to Generalmajor.

Awards 

 Knight's Cross of the Iron Cross on 28 December 1942 as Oberst and commander of Infanterie-Regiment 376

References

Citations

Bibliography

 

1894 births
1943 deaths
Military personnel from Hamburg
Major generals of the German Army (Wehrmacht)
German Army personnel of World War I
Recipients of the clasp to the Iron Cross, 1st class
Recipients of the Gold German Cross
Recipients of the Knight's Cross of the Iron Cross
German Army personnel killed in World War II
Prussian Army personnel
Reichswehr personnel
German Army generals of World War II